Robert Steven Huie (born 1976) is an American lawyer from California who is serving as a United States district judge of the United States District Court for the Southern District of California.

Education 

Huie was born in 1976 in Albany, Georgia. He received his Bachelor of Arts from Calvin University in 1998 and his Juris Doctor from Yale Law School in 2002.

Legal career 

Huie served as a law clerk for Judge José A. Cabranes of the United States Court of Appeals for the Second Circuit from 2003 to 2004. He worked as a civil litigator at Latham & Watkins from 2004 to 2008 and as an attorney at Wiggin and Dana from 2002 to 2003. From 2008 to 2020, he served as an Assistant United States Attorney in the criminal division of the United States Attorney's office for the Southern District of California where he was Deputy Chief of the Office's Major Frauds and Public Corruption Section. He helped lead the early prosecution of the Fat Leonard scandal, which involved corruption in the United States Navy. From 2015 to 2018, Huie served as a legal advisor to the United States Department of Justice's Office of Overseas Prosecutorial Development, Assistance and Training.

From 2020 to 2022, he was an attorney with Jones Day, where he served on the firm's Diversity, Inclusion & Advancement Committee.

Federal judicial service 

On January 19, 2022, President Joe Biden named Huie to serve as a United States district judge of the United States District Court for the Southern District of California. President Biden nominated Huie to the seat vacated by Judge Michael Anello, who assumed senior status on October 31, 2018. On March 2, 2022, a hearing on his nomination was held before the Senate Judiciary Committee. On April 4, 2022, his nomination was reported out of committee by a 11–10 vote. On June 9, 2022, his nomination was confirmed by a 51–46 vote. Huie is the first Biden nominee to be confirmed in any district court without Senate Democrats invoking cloture. He received  his judicial commission on June 14, 2022.

Personal life
Huie is Asian Pacific American (AAPI). His paternal grandfather was an immigrant from China.

References

External links 
 

1976 births
Living people
21st-century American judges
21st-century American lawyers
American consuls
American jurists of Asian descent
Assistant United States Attorneys
California lawyers
Calvin University alumni
Jones Day people
Judges of the United States District Court for the Southern District of California
People associated with Latham & Watkins
People from Albany, Georgia
United States Department of Justice lawyers
United States district court judges appointed by Joe Biden
Yale Law School alumni